Discovery Bay is a residential development in Hong Kong, on Lantau Island.
Discovery Bay may also refer to:
 Discovery Bay (Antarctica), a bay in the South Shetland Islands
 Discovery Bay (Australia), a bay straddling the border between South Australia and Victoria in Australia
 Discovery Bay Coastal Park, a protected area in Victoria (Australia)
 Discovery Bay Marine National Park, a marine protected area in Victoria (Australia)
 Discovery Bay, California, a community in the U.S.
 Discovery Bay, Jamaica, a town in Jamaica
 Discovery Bay, Washington, a community and bay in the U.S.
 A planned (but never built) land at Disneyland

See also
 Disco Bay